The West Chester Area School District serves the borough and surrounding townships of West Chester, Pennsylvania, United States. The other parts include the surrounding townships of East Bradford, East Goshen, Thornbury, West Goshen, West Whiteland, and Westtown, all in Chester County, as well as Thornbury Township in adjacent Delaware County. The WCASD consists of eleven elementary schools, three middle schools, and three high schools, as of the fall 2018 school year. Elementary schools include grades 1-5, middle schools grades 6-8, and high schools grades 9-12.

Its headquarters are in West Whiteland Township, near the Exton census-designated place.

Background
Almost 12,000 students from kindergarten through 12th grade attend schools in the WCASD. The class size average is more than 25 students. Over 900 teachers are employed by the WCASD, with 64 percent holding at least a master's degree. For the 2021–2022 school year, the district had a $279.5 million budget.

Awards and recognition
At Henderson High school, the Promethean torchlight award was given to a chemistry teacher, Sam M. This grant was awarded to only ten classrooms in the entire United States of America. This grant provides the classroom with many state-of-the-art equipment features, including the ActivWand, Expressions, and other technology.

For the third consecutive year, the West Chester Area School District has received the top rating of "Gold Medal District" by Expansion Management Magazine in its annual Education Quotient issue.

This year's rating places the school district among the top 17 percent of all public secondary school districts in the United States with an enrollment of at least 3,300 students. Those districts—totaling 10 and serving a population of more than 0 million students—were included in an extensive study conducted by the magazine.

Elementary schools
The West Chester Area School District includes the following elementary schools:
 East Bradford Elementary
 East Goshen Elementary
 Exton Elementary
 Fern Hill Elementary
 Glen Acres Elementary
 Hillsdale Elementary
 Mary C. Howse Elementary
 Penn Wood Elementary
 Sarah Starkweather Elementary
 Westtown-Thornbury Elementary
 Greystone Elementary

Secondary schools
The West Chester Area School District includes the following secondary schools:
 Fugett Middle School
 Peirce Middle School
 Stetson Middle School
 Henderson High School
 East High School
 Rustin High School

References

External links

West Chester Area School District webpage

School districts in Delaware County, Pennsylvania
School districts in Chester County, Pennsylvania
West Chester, Pennsylvania